Lego Jurassic World: Legend of Isla Nublar  is a 13-episode CG-animated television miniseries that acts as a prequel to the 2015 film Jurassic World. Set in 2012 and inspired by the Lego toyline, the show is a direct followup to the Lego Jurassic World: The Secret Exhibit television special that debuted on NBC in the United States in 2018. The series began airing in Canada on Family Channel on July 6, 2019.

Plot
The series takes place at Jurassic World, a dinosaur theme park on the island of Isla Nublar. Velociraptor handler Owen Grady and the park's operations manager Claire Dearing work to keep Jurassic World from falling into ruin unaware that Dennis Nedry's nephew Danny Nedermeyer has a secret agenda to ruin it.

Cast

Episodes

Specials

Broadcast
In Australia, the series debuted on 9Go! on August 15, 2019. In the United States, Nickelodeon picked up the series and began airing it on September 14, with the first episode made available on video-on-demand platforms beginning August 25, 2019. ITV in the United Kingdom premiered the series as part of their CITV block on September 7, 2019.

See also
 Lego Jurassic World (theme)
 Lego Jurassic World: The Secret Exhibit
 Lego Jurassic World (video game)
 Lego Dimensions
 Dinosaurs in Jurassic Park

References

External links
 
 LEGO: Jurassic World – Legend of Isla Nublar at Family.ca 
 
 Official Jurassic World website
 Official Jurassic Outpost website
 Official Nickelodeon website

2019 Canadian television series debuts
2019 Canadian television series endings
2019 American television series debuts
2019 American television series endings
2010s Canadian animated television series
2010s American animated television series
2020s Canadian animated television series
2020s American animated television series
American children's animated action television series
American children's animated adventure television series
American children's animated comic science fiction television series
American children's animated drama television series
American children's animated science fantasy television series
Canadian children's animated action television series
Canadian children's animated adventure television series
Canadian children's animated comic science fiction television series
Canadian children's animated drama television series
Canadian children's animated science fantasy television series
Television series set in 2012
Works based on Jurassic Park
Nickelodeon original programming
Animated television series about dinosaurs
J